Jean-Charles-Alfred Deléhelle (12 January 1826 – 1893) was a French composer.

Born in Paris, Deléhelle studied at the Conservatoire de Paris, where he was a pupil of Hippolyte Colet and Adolphe Adam. In 1851, he won the Premier Grand Prix de Rome with the cantata Le Prisonnier.

After a stay at the Villa Medici in Rome and a trip to Naples and through several German cities, Deléhelle settled as a composer in Paris. 1859 his operetta L'Ile d'Amour was premiered at the Théâtre des Bouffes-Parisiens after a libretto by Camille du Locle. It was praised by the critics and had success with the audience, although it had to assert itself against the competition of a simultaneously played operetta by Léo Delibes.

Only two other works by Deléhelle have survived: the opéra comique Monsieur Policinelle, premiered at the Théâtre de l'Athénée in 1873, and the opera comique Don Spavento based on a libretto by Léon Morand and Gustave Wattier, premiered at the Koninklijke Schouwburg of The Hague in January 1883.

References

External links 
 Biography on Musica et memoria

1826 births
1893 deaths
Musicians from Paris
Conservatoire de Paris alumni
French Romantic composers
French opera composers
French operetta composers
19th-century French composers
Prix de Rome for composition